Dennis Davis (1927 – 19 February 2015) was a British mountaineer.

Dennis got his taste for the Himalaya in 1955 when, along with Alf Gregory, Ted Courtney and Peter Boultbee he visited the Rolwaling sub-range. Between the four of them they climbed 19 peaks, of which 16 were first ascents of between 19,000 and 22,000 ft.

In 1957, Dennis and Charles Evans, as a two-man team without supplementary oxygen, climbed Annapurna IV before making an ambitious, but unsuccessful attempt on Annapurna II.

Dennis, along with Sherpa Tashi completed the first ascent of Nuptse on 16 May 1961. Other (British) members of the expedition were Joe Walmsley (expedition leader), Les Brown, Chris Bonnington Jim Swallow, Simon Clark and John Streetley. They travelled to Nepal in two Standard Vanguard estate cars by road, through countries including Turkey, Iran, Afghanistan and India.  The climb was completed without the aid of oxygen.

Expeditions
 1955 - Rolwaling Himal
 1957 - Annapurna IV
 1961 - Nuptse

See also
 http://www.climbers-club.co.uk/journal/original/1962%20Journal-p306-312.pdf

References

British mountain climbers
1927 births
2015 deaths
People from Dulwich